Owain Tudur Jones (born 15 October 1984) is a Welsh former footballer who played as a defensive midfielder. He represented the Wales national football team and during his club career he played for Porthmadog, Bangor City, Swansea City, Swindon Town, Norwich City, Yeovil Town, Brentford, Inverness Caledonian Thistle, Hibernian and Falkirk. He is currently assistant manager of Wales C. He is also currently a presenter for the Welsh football show Sgorio and Welsh magazine show Heno.

Club career
Born in Bangor, Gwynedd, Jones joined Bangor City from Cymru Alliance club Porthmadog during the summer of 2001. In four seasons, Jones was in the Citizens' team that lost the 2002 Welsh Cup Final to Barry Town at Park Avenue, Aberystwyth. He also played in the UEFA Intertoto Cup in June 2002 against Romanian side Gloria Bistriţa.

Swansea City
Jones signed for Swansea City from Bangor City for a fee of £5,000 prior to the 2005–06 season after a successful trial period. He was offered a new two-year contract with Swansea in October, which he signed in November. During his first full season as a professional he made 21 league appearances, scoring three goals. He also made his debut for the Welsh Under-21 side and at the end of the season also received a call up to the full international squad. On 19 December 2006 it was announced that Jones would travel to the United States to see surgeon Dr. Richard Steadman for a second opinion on his ongoing knee problem.

After spending the second half of the 2008–09 season on loan at Swindon Town, he joined League One team Norwich City on a three-year contract on 16 June 2009. Due to Swansea City having a one-year option on Jones' contract, the fee of £250,000 was agreed between the two clubs – said to include add-ons dependent upon both the club's and Jones' future success.

Norwich City
Jones signed for Norwich City in 2009 for a fee of £250,000, he made his debut in the 7–1 defeat to Colchester on the opening day of the season. He scored his first goal for Norwich in a defeat at Brentford on 18 August 2009. He joined Yeovil Town on a month's loan on 27 January 2010.

Once his loan at Yeovil Town had expired, Jones began training with Plymouth Argyle from 1 August 2010. The following day he made his debut against amateur side Saltash United. Jones scored the third goal for Argyle in their 8–0 thrashing. However, it was later announced that completion of the loan signing had stalled.

Jones agreed a second loan deal with Yeovil Town on 27 August 2010. His loan spell was extended by a month on 22 October 2010. After returning from his three-month loan spell at Yeovil, Jones made a return to the Norwich City bench in the 2–1 away win over Derby County, even making a late substitute appearance coming on for Henri Lansbury. On 21 January 2011, Jones joined Brentford on a month's loan.

Inverness Caledonian Thistle
On 28 July 2011, Jones signed for Inverness Caledonian Thistle on a one-year deal. Inverness manager Terry Butcher was excited about the midfield presence the Welsh international could bring to the team. He made his debut in a 1–0 home loss to Hibs. Soon afterwards he suffered a knee cartilage injury, requiring surgery. He missed six months of the 2011–12 Scottish Premier League season due to the injury, but agreed a new contract with Inverness in June 2012.

Hibernian
On 31 May 2013, Jones agreed a two-year deal to join Hibernian. On 1 September 2014, he was released by Hibernian.

Falkirk
Three days after leaving Hibernian, Jones signed a two-year contract with Falkirk.

After only making a handful of appearances, Jones once again injured the knee which had been causing him problems throughout his career. On 6 March 2015, via Twitter, Jones announced that he had retired from playing professional football after choosing to take up medical advice he had been given.

International career
Jones represented Wales four times at Under-19 level and made three appearances at Under-21 level. He made his international debut for Wales in a 2–0 win against Luxembourg on 26 March 2008. Jones was recalled to the Wales squad in October 2013, after 10 players withdrew due to injury.

Coaching career 
Jones is currently assistant manager of Wales C.

Career statistics

Club

International

Honours
 Welsh Premier League Team of the Year: 2004–05

References

External links
Owain Tudur Jones profile at the Norwich City website
Owain Tudur Jones Welsh Premier Stats

Owain Tudur Jones profile at the Football Association of Wales website

1984 births
Living people
Footballers from Bangor, Gwynedd
Welsh footballers
Wales under-21 international footballers
Wales international footballers
Association football midfielders
Porthmadog F.C. players
Bangor City F.C. players
Swansea City A.F.C. players
Swindon Town F.C. players
Norwich City F.C. players
Yeovil Town F.C. players
Brentford F.C. players
Inverness Caledonian Thistle F.C. players
Hibernian F.C. players
Falkirk F.C. players
English Football League players
Cymru Premier players
Scottish Premier League players
People educated at Ysgol Tryfan
Scottish Professional Football League players
Welsh-language broadcasters